Murad Ramazanov (born October 16, 1995) is a Russian mixed martial artist, currently competes in the Welterweight division for ONE Championship. He has previously fought in Fight Nights Global and Gorilla Fighting Championship (now Eagle FC).

Background 
Ramazanov was born on October 16, 1995 in Republic of Dagestan, Russia. He came from a close, middle-class family in the capital of Makhachkala, where his father ran a successful shoe business and his mother tended to him and his siblings. With the sea and the mountains within reach, Ramazanov grew up both in the outdoors and on the streets, where he could burn his energy.

Mixed martial arts career

Early career 
After compiling an amateur record of 5–0, Ramazanov started his professional MMA in 2014. He fought under various promotions such as Professional Fighting Championship (ProFC), Fight Nights Global (now AMC Fight Nights) and Gorilla Fighting Championship (now Eagle FC) and amassed a record of 8–0 prior to his joined the ONE Championship.

ONE Championship
In his promotional debut, Ramazanov faced Bae Myung Ho on February 28, 2020, at ONE: King of the Jungle. He won the fight via technical knockout in the first round.

Ramazanov faced Hiroyuki Tetsuka on October 30, 2020 and aired on November 13, 2020, at ONE: Inside the Martix 3. He won the fight via unanimous decision.

Ramazanov faced former ONE Welterweight World Champion Zebaztian Kadestam on December 3, 2021 and aired on December 17, 2021, at ONE: Winter Warriors II. He won the fight via unanimous decision.

Ramazanov was scheduled to face former ONE Middleweight World Championship challenger Ken Hasegawa on February 11, 2022, at ONE: Bad Blood. However, Hasegawa withdrew from the bout due to an injury and the bout was scrapped.

Ramazanov faced Roberto Soldić on December 3, 2022, at ONE on Prime Video 5. During the middle of round one, Ramazanov accidentally connected with a knee to the groin of Soldić, who could not continue. The fight was declared a no contest.

Championships and accomplishments

Amateur title
World Mixed Martial Arts Association
2016 WMMAA Lightweight Championship
Union of Mixed Martial Arts "MMA" of Russia
2015 Obinsk Cup Lightweight Tournament winner
2016 Union of MMA Russia Lightweight Championship

Mixed martial arts record 

|-
|NC
|align=center|11–0 (1)
|Roberto Soldić
|No Contest (accidental knee to groin)
|ONE on Prime Video 5
|
|align=center|1
|align=center|3:01
|Pasay, Philippines
|
|-
|Win
|align=center| 11–0
|Zebaztian Kadestam 
|Decision (unanimous)
|ONE: Winter Warriors II
|
|align=center| 3
|align=center| 5:00
|Kallang, Singapore 
|
|-
|Win
|align=center| 10–0
|Hiroyuki Tetsuka
|Decision (unanimous)
|ONE: Inside the Martix 3
|
|align=center| 3
|align=center| 5:00
|Kallang, Singapore 
|
|-
|Win
|align=center| 9–0
|Bae Myung Ho
|TKO (punches)
|ONE: King of the Jungle
|
|align=center| 1
|align=center| 4:53
|Kallang, Singapore 
|
|-
|Win
|align=center| 8–0
|Farshid Gholami
|Submission (guillotine choke)
|GFC 22
|
|align=center| 2
|align=center| 2:07
|Krasnodar, Russia
|
|-
|Win
|align=center| 7–0
|Nursultan Ruziboev
|Decision (unanimous)
|Gorets FC: For the Prizes of V.Volotov
|
|align=center| 3
|align=center| 5:00
|Dagestan, Russia
|
|-
|Win
|align=center| 6–0
|Ulugbek Oskanov
|Submission (rear-naked choke)
|Fight Nights Global 93
|
|align=center| 2
|align=center| 3:18
|Mytishchi, Russia
|
|-
|Win
|align=center| 5–0
|Ruslan Khaskhanov
|Submission (rear-naked choke)
|ProFC 63
|
|align=center| 2
|align=center| 2:20
|Rostov-on-Don, Russia
|
|-
|Win
|align=center| 4–0
|Makamagomed Khayrullaev 
|KO (punch)
|CSDF Federation 1
|
|align=center| 1
|align=center| 0:20
|Pyatigorsk, Russia
|
|-
|Win
|align=center| 3–0
|Khikmet Abdulaev
|TKO (punches)
|Severo-Kavkazsky Federal Okrug Championships
|
|align=center| 1
|align=center| 2:14
|Stavropol, Russia
|
|-
|Win
|align=center| 2–0
|Khizri Magomedov
|TKO (punches)
|Khasavyurt Fight: Dagestan MMA Open Cup 2014
|
|align=center| 2
|align=center| N/A
|Dagestan, Russia
|
|-
|Win
|align=center| 1–0
|Salman Salimkhanov
|Decision (unanimous)
|Moscow Open Pankration Cup 2014
|
|align=center| 2
|align=center| 5:00
|Moscow, Russia
|

Amateur mixed martial arts record

|-
|Win
|align=center| 5–0
|Zheng Liu
|TKO (punches)
|2016 WMMAA World Championships: Finals
|
|align=center|1
|align=center|1:59
|Macau, SAR, China
|
|-
|Win
|align=center| 4–0
|Ilyas Chyngyzbek Uulu
|Decision (unanimous)
|rowspan=2|2016 WMMAA World Championships: Selection
|rowspan=2|
|align=center|2
|align=center|5:00
|rowspan=2|Macau, SAR, China
|
|-
|Win
|align=center| 3–0
|Altynbek Bahtygeldinov
|Decision (unanimous)
|align=center|2
|align=center|5:00
|
|-
|Win
|align=center| 2–0
|Ali Abdulkhalikov
|Decision (unanimous)
|2016 Russian MMA Championships
|
|align=center|2
|align=center|5:00
|Orenburg, Russia
|
|-
|Win
|align=center| 1–0
|Kurban Taygibov
|TKO (punches)
|Obninsk Open Cup 2015
|
|align=center|2
|align=center|N/A
|Obninsk, Russia
|
|-
|}

See also
List of current ONE fighters
List of undefeated mixed martial artists

References

External links
 
Murad Ramazanov in ONE Championship

1995 births
Russian people of Dagestani descent
Dagestani mixed martial artists
Featherweight mixed martial artists
Lightweight mixed martial artists
Welterweight mixed martial artists
Middleweight mixed martial artists
Mixed martial artists utilizing wrestling
Mixed martial artists utilizing sambo
Living people
People from Makhachkala
Russian male mixed martial artists
Russian sambo practitioners
Sportspeople from Makhachkala